In the United Kingdom, an accommodation bridge or occupation bridge is one that preserves a pre-existing private road, path or right of access when a major transport route is built across it. Without the bridge, access would be disrupted. Accommodation bridges are usually built at the cost of the route developer, as part of the conditions for obtaining the land for building the new route.

The term is not applied where the new route crosses an existing public highway.

Canals
The first accommodation bridges were built as part of 18th-century canal building. Most were provided for farmers, whose lands and grazing were separated by the canal. The first canals developed from rivers, with short lengths of canal built to bypass obstacles, such as weirs and millponds. The river represented a long-established and accepted boundary, but these new sections were resented by landlords.

Unlike turnpike roads, drovers could not simply cross the new road but now needed a bridge. These bridges also needed to meet the standards of the canal builder, allowing the towpath through beneath, sufficient clearance for passing boats and being adequately constructed to be robust, without risk of a collapse blocking the canal. To save costs, the Kennet Navigation, in flat country, used swing bridges rather than arches. Other canals such as the Oxford Canal, also used lifting bridges.

Railways

Most accommodation bridges, in the UK at least, were constructed during the railway building boom of the mid-19th century. British practice avoided level crossings wherever possible, except in the flat parts of the country where building a raised approach to a bridge would be more costly. Nevertheless the term is still more usually applied to canal bridges.

As the load carried by the new railway was almost always greater than the old path, nearly all accommodation bridges are overbridges, carrying the old track over the new railway. Underpasses were relatively rare, except where more convenient in hilly country, as the old track may have followed the land more closely than a gradient-sensitive railway.

In Britain an accommodation bridge is the name for a bridge connecting land that belonged to one owner severed by the railway. An occupation bridge is the name for a bridge that carried an existing private road or took the railway over an existing private road. Similar terms were applied to level crossings.

Motorways
Accommodation bridges were rarely needed across roads, as a road junction would be provided instead. This changed in the 1960s, with the development of the motorway network, where slow-speed local traffic is segregated from the high-speed traffic.

See also
Cattle creep

References

External links 

 

  Canal restoration project involving the construction of a new accommodation bridge to maintain a previous right of access.

Bridges by mode of traffic